Krymske is a settlement in Donetsk Oblast of eastern Ukraine, at about 57 km NbE from the centre of Donetsk city, at 2.5 km NE from Toretsk.

The War in Donbass, that started in mid-April 2014, has brought along both civilian and military casualties.

Demographics
In 2001 the settlement had 59 inhabitants. Native language as of the Ukrainian Census of 2001:
Ukrainian – 20.34%
Russian  – 79.66%

References

Rural settlements in Donetsk Oblast